Lake Vashka is a lake near the center of Barwick Valley, about  east of Webb Glacier in Victoria Land. It was named by the Victoria University of Wellington Antarctic Expedition (VUWAE) (1958–59) after Vashka (Vaska), a sled dog of the British Antarctic Expedition, 1910–13.

Vashka Crag is an abrupt rock crag at the east end of The Fortress, a series of four promontories on the north side of Barwick Valley in Victoria Land. It was named by the Victoria University of Wellington Antarctic Expedition (VUWAE), 1959–60, in association with nearby Lake Vashka, located just below and to the southeast.

Reference 

Lakes of Victoria Land
McMurdo Dry Valleys